The Dallas mayoral election of 1999 took place on May 2, 1999, to elect the mayor of Dallas, Texas. The race was officially nonpartisan. It saw the reelection of Ron Kirk, who won the election by taking a majority in the initial round of voting, thereby negating the need for a runoff to be held.

Results

References

Dallas
Dallas
1999
Non-partisan elections
1990s in Dallas